Zarkuiyeh (also Romanized as Zārkū’īyeh; also known as Deh-e Zār Kūh) is a village in Jolgeh Rural District, in the Central District of Behabad County, Yazd Province, Iran. At the 2006 census, its population was 175, in 48 families.

References 

Populated places in Behabad County